Andile Ernest Jali (born 10 April 1990) is a South African soccer player who plays for Mamelodi Sundowns in the Premier Soccer League and the South African national football team.

Club career

University of Pretoria

Mhlekazi, as his teammates refer to him, has made a name for himself since moving from the National First Division side Pretoria University to Soweto giants Orlando Pirates.

Orlando Pirates

He joined Orlando Pirates in 2009. He since became the subject of favourable comparisons to Benedict Vilakazi - who wore the number 15 jersey before Jali.

Jali was part of the Orlando Pirates squad that made history in South African football by winning three trophies in one season under Dutch coach Ruud Krol. The same team went on to defend two of their trophies won in the previous year and also win another to make it a back to back treble. Jali has established himself as one of the most important players in the Orlando Pirates squad, winning several trophies at his time at the club. Partly due to his success with the Soweto side, he was touted as the future captain of the South African national team (Bafana Bafana). He has also received acclaim for his performances with some analysts claiming he has the potential to make a name for himself in European football.

KV Oostende

In January 2014, Jali signed for Belgian Pro League team K.V. Oostende. During the 2015–16 season, he's second at the club; Jali was impressive, helping guide Oostende to a 5th-place finish in the Belgian Pro League.

International career

He was a member of the South African squad at the 2009 FIFA U-20 World Cup in Egypt.

He made his debut for South Africa in 2010. In 2010, Jali was named in the preliminary 30-man South African squad for the 2010 FIFA World Cup but missed out on the 23-man squad because of a mild heart condition which ruled him out of the competition.

During 2015, Jali was called up the 2015 African Cup of Nations, playing in South Africa's games against Algeria, Ghana and Senegal in the competition.

International goals
Scores and results list South Africa's goal tally first.

Honours
Orlando Pirates

Premier Soccer League
2010-11, 2011–12
Nedbank Cup
2011
Telkom Knockout
2011
MTN 8
2010, 2011
CAF Champions League
Runner-up: 2013
Carling Black Label
2011, 2012

Mamelodi Sundowns

Premier Soccer League
2018-2019
2019-2020
2020-2021
2021-2022

Nedbank Cup
2020
2022

Telkom Knockout
2019

MTN 8
2021

CAF Champions League
Quarter-Finalist x2

Individual
 Nedbank Cup Player of the Tournament in Premier Soccer League: 2011
PSL player of the season, Premier soccer League winner 2019 /2020 season with Sundowns. Nedbank cup 2020 with Sundowns.

References

External links
 
 
 
 
 

1990 births
Living people
People from Matatiele Local Municipality
South African soccer players
South Africa international soccer players
Orlando Pirates F.C. players
K.V. Oostende players
Belgian Pro League players
Association football midfielders
University of Pretoria F.C. players
Mamelodi Sundowns F.C. players
South African expatriates in Belgium
2015 Africa Cup of Nations players
Soccer players from the Eastern Cape